Free French Flight refers to three specific fledgling units in the Free French Air Force (FAFL) which were created in the Middle East on 8 July 1940.
 Free French Flight N° 1 its name later changed to  N° 2 . Subsequently it became the Nancy squadron of GB Lorraine. It was formed around two Martin 167A-3 Maryland bombers which flew to Mersa Matruh, Egypt, on 19 July 1940.
It was hierarchically a part of No. 33 Squadron RAF, and the unit later had a dual designation of C Flight, No. 73 Squadron RAF. Subsequently it became .
 Free French Communication Flight N° 3 - its name later changed to French Transport Flight. It consisted of five different French-built aircraft, it was hierarchically a part of No. 267 Squadron RAF.

Free French Flight N° 2 was stationed at Haifa and initially consisted of one Potez 63.11 (a second and third arriving on 14 October and 3 November 1940 respectively) and two MS 406 (a third appearing on 14 February 1941). A Miles Magister was used as a hack and was superseded by a Loire 130 on 12 March 1941. The unit diary refers to the arrival of a Potez 29 and a Bloch MB.81 (with a Salmson 9 powerplant) from Heliopolis on 28 September 1940 but neither aircraft appears in the subsequent daily unit statistics forms (RAF Form 765a). A memo dated 4 April 1941 from the RAF's Free French liaison officer to General Spears advises 'in practically every case the aircraft were unserviceable chiefly owing to lack of spares'.

The four bombers were intercepted by Flying Officer Peronne in a Potez 63.11 and Warrant Officer Ballatore in a MS 406. Due to the deteriorating serviceability of the aircraft, flying hours decreased and the unit diary itself only covers September 1940.

In addition to these units, there were some units formed in the UK:
 Topic - six Blenheims. Along with "Jam", there was a redeployment to Fort Lamy. Both units were merged into the  n°1 (GRB1), with an official inception date of 30 March 1941, which subsequently became the Metz squadron of GB Lorraine.
 Jam - Official designation  n°1 (GC1). It consisted of four squadrons.
 French Fighter Group - this unit's small complement of Dewoitine D.520 fighters became part of E.F.C. 1 (see above) and its Blenheims became part of GRB1.

Independent of the hierarchy of the RAF, there were aviation detachments in Chad, Cameroon and Equatorial Africa.

See also
No. 327 Squadron RAF
No. 340 Squadron RAF
No. 341 Squadron RAF
No. 342 Squadron RAF
List of RAF squadrons

References

Aircraft of the Free French Flight
Potez 63.11
Dewoitine D.520
Morane-Saulnier M.S.406
Martin 167A-3 Maryland
Bristol Blenheim
Westland Lysander
Hawker Hurricane

External links
The (Free) French Air Force in 1940-1945 (Listing attempt)
Article on the  presence in Chad of French Air Forces (in French)
Two images of the Potez 63.11 in the markings of Free French Flight N° 2
Table of French allied Air Force units in World War II (in Czech)
An image of a 1/72 model MS-406 in the markings of Free French Flight N° 2
Models of Free French aircraft, including some Free French Flight aircraft (in French)
Serial numbers of Free French aircraft, and RAF aircraft
Forum thread about Potez 63.11 in Free French service with the RAF
Markings of Potez 63.11 in French Fighter Flight No.2 for AX673, AX680 & AX691
Contents of Aéro Journal No.33 which includes the article Les French Flights - 1940, des escadrilles francaises au sein de la RAF
Biography of the pilot of Potez 63.11 AX673, Albert Zevaco

Military units and formations established in 1940
Free French Forces
Military units and formations of the Royal Air Force in World War II
Royal Air Force aircraft squadrons
French Air and Space Force
F